Man on a Mission may refer to:

"Man on a Mission", a song by Gamma Ray on the 1995 album Land of the Free
"Man on a Mission", a song by Hall & Oates on the 2003 album Do It for Love
"Man on a Mission", a song by Hemingway Corner
"Man on a Mission", a song by John Kay and Steppenwolf on the 1987 album Rock & Roll Rebels
"Man on a Mission", a song by Richard Ashcroft on the 2002 album Human Conditions
"Man on a Mission", a song by Van Halen on the 1991 album For Unlawful Carnal Knowledge
Men on a Mission, a professional wrestling tag team